Bobby is the third studio album by American singer Bobby Brown, released in 1992 by MCA Records. The album continued the R&B/new jack swing sound of its predecessor, Don't Be Cruel. Babyface, L.A. Reid, and Daryl Simmons returned as producers and songwriters, however, Brown also worked with other producers, most notably Teddy Riley, who was considered a pioneer of the new jack swing genre. Riley also co-wrote and produced the majority of the album. Brown had more creative input and control of the album, becoming an executive producer and co-writing seven of the album's thirteen songs. The album received mixed reviews from music critics.

Bobby peaked at number two on the US Billboard 200 Album Chart and spawned three major US Billboard Hot 100 singles; "Humpin' Around" (US #3), "Good Enough" (US #7), and " Get Away" (US #14). The album also reached number one on the Billboard R&B Albums chart, and reached the top 10 in Australia, New Zealand, and Sweden. The album also included a duet, "Something in Common", with Brown's wife, singer Whitney Houston, that became a hit in several international markets.

Brown received his second Grammy Award nomination for Best Male R&B Vocal Performance at the 35th Grammy Awards for the single "Humpin' Around", however, he did not win. The album was certified double platinum by the Recording Industry Association of America (RIAA) on February 19, 1993.

Track listing

Sample credits
"Humpin' Around" contains a chorus sample of "Dancing Days", written by Jimmy Page and Robert Plant, and performed by Led Zeppelin; a sample riff of "Rock Steady", written and performed by Aretha Franklin; a sample riff of "Bang Zoom (Let's Go-Go)", written by Full Force, Howard Thompson, Adelaida Martinez and U.T.F.O., and performed by The Real Roxanne featuring Howie Tee; and a bass sample of "The Grunt"; written and performed by The J.B.'s.
"Two Can Play That Game" contains a sample riff of "Sing a Simple Song", written by Sylvester Stewart, and performed by Sly & the Family Stone.
"Get Away" contains a chorus sample of "(Not Just) Knee Deep", written by George Clinton, and performed by Funkadelic; a sample riff of "Kool is Back", written by Gene Redd, Jimmy Crosby, Ronald Bell, Claydes C. Smith, George Brown, Donald Boyce, Robert Mickens, Dennis Thomas, Robert "Kool" Bell and Richard Westfield, and performed by Funk, Inc.; and a sample riff of "Spend the Night", written by Teddy Riley, Gene Griffin and Aaron Hall, and performed by Guy.
"One More Night" contains a sample riff of "School Boy Crush", written by Roger Ball, Malcolm Duncan, Steven Ferrone, Alan Gorrie, Owen McIntyre and Hamish Stuart, and performed by Average White Band.
"Something in Common" contains a sample riff of "Want to Be With You", written by Gene Griffin and William Aquart, and performed by Zan.
"That's the Way Love Is" contains a sample riff of "I Get Lifted", written by Harry Wayne Casey and Richard Finch, and performed by KC & the Sunshine Band.

Personnel
 Keyboards: Teddy Riley, L.A. Reid, Babyface, Big Dave Repace, Huston Singletary, Dennis Austin, Cedric Caldwell, Robbie Buchanan
 Drum programming: Teddy Riley, L.A. Reid, Babyface, Big Dave Repace, Huston Singletary, Dennis Austin, Donald Parks
 Drums: Derek "DOA" Allen, Ricky Lawson
 Percussion: Nate Hughes, Terry McMillan
 Saxophone: Daniel LeMelle
 Bass: Nathan East
 Guitar: Paul Jackson, Jr.
 Background vocals: Bobby Brown, Teddy Riley, Chauncey Hannibal, Levi Little, Joseph Stonestreet, Marsha McClurkin, Mary Brown, Bernard Belle, Omar Chandler, Babyface, Emanuel Officer, Debra Killings, Ricky Bell, Daryl Simmons, Chanté Moore, Derek "DOA" Allen, Big Dave Repace, Robert Gonzales, Trina Broussard, Dennis Austin, Sophia Bender, BeBe Winans, CeCe Winans, Angie Winans, Debra Winans
 Recording engineer: Jean-Marie Horvat, Barney Perkins, Jim Zumpano, John Rogers, Neal H. Pogue, George Pappas, Phil Tan, Billy Whittington, Jeff Balding, Ronnie Brookshire, Mike Poole, Mike McCarthy, Rick Will
 Mixing: Dave Way, Thom Russo, Teddy Riley, Jean-Marie Horvat, Barney Perkins, Dave Aron, Milton Chan, Keith "K.C." Cohen, Kimm James, Tony "TK" Kidd, Bobby Brown, Derek "DOA" Allen, Neal H. Pogue, Jeff Balding
 Mastering: Bernie Grundman
 Executive producer: Louil Silas, Jr., Bobby Brown, Tommy Brown
 Photography: Albert Watson, Todd Gray
 Art direction: Vartan
 Design: John Coulter

Charts

Weekly charts

Year-end charts

Certifications

See also
List of number-one R&B albums of 1992 (U.S.)

References

1992 albums
Bobby Brown albums
MCA Records albums
Albums produced by L.A. Reid
Albums produced by Babyface (musician)
Albums produced by Teddy Riley